Mohammed Al Aqib is a Qatari footballer who currently plays for Al Bidda .

In 2017, he was loaned to Muaither SC, a club colloquially known as  Al-Mu'aidar SC.

References

1983 births
Living people
Qatari footballers
Al Ahli SC (Doha) players
Qatar SC players
Muaither SC players
Al Sadd SC players
Umm Salal SC players
Al-Khor SC players
Al Bidda SC players
Qatar Stars League players
Qatari Second Division players
Association football midfielders